Piper is a surname of German, English, French and Scandinavian origin, derived from the Old English "pipere" and the Old Norse "pipari, meaning "flute" or "fluteplayer", originating from long pepper in Indo-Aryan languages.  People with the surname include:

Note: Persons may appear in more than one category.

Academics
 Charles Piper (1867–1926), American botanist and agriculturalist
 Franciszek Piper (born 1941), Polish historian
 James A. Piper (born c. 1949), New Zealand/Australian physicist
 Martha Piper, President of the University of British Columbia
 Otto Piper (1841–1921), German architectural historian
 Ross Piper British zoologist

Businesspeople
 Christina Piper (1673–1752), Swedish countess, landowner and entrepreneur, wife of the politician Carl Piper (see below)
 Odessa Piper (born 1953), American restaurateur
 William T. Piper (1881–1970), American airplane manufacturer, founder of Piper Aircraft

Artists
 Adrian Piper (born 1948), American conceptual artist and philosopher
 Christian Piper (1941–2019), German artist
 Edward Piper (1938–1990), English painter
 John Piper (artist) (1903–1992), English artist
 Keith Piper (artist) (born 1960), British artist
 Lloyd Piper (1923–1983), Australian cartoonist
 Luke Piper (born 1966), English painter, son of Edward Piper
 Rose Piper (1917–2005), American artist
 Tom Piper (born 1964), British theatre designer

Actors and directors
 Ailsa Piper (born 1959), Australian actress, playwright and director
 Billie Piper (born 1982), English singer, dancer and actress
 Frederick Piper (1902–1979), English actor
 Gordon Piper (1932–2004), Australian actor, theatre director and scriptwriter
 Jacki Piper (born 1946), British actor
 Jason Piper, English voice actor and ballet dancer
 "Rowdy" Roddy Piper (1954–2015), Canadian professional wrestler and actor

Musicians
 Billie Piper (born 1982), English singer, dancer and actress
 Myfanwy Piper (1911–1997), English art critic and librettist
 Randy Piper (born 1953), American rock guitarist and songwriter

Writers
 Ailsa Piper (born 1959), Australian actress, playwright and director
 David Piper (curator) (1918–1990), British museum curator and author
 Evelyn Piper, pen name of Merriam Modell (1908–1994), American author of short stories, suspense and pulp fiction
 H. Beam Piper (1904–1964), American science fiction author
 John Piper (theologian) (born 1946), American Calvinist Baptist preacher and author
 Michael Collins Piper (born 1960), American political writer, conspiracy theorist and talk radio host

Politicians
 August J. Piper (1864–1945), American politician
 Carl Piper (1657-1716), Swedish politician
 Greg Piper (born 1957), Australian politician
 Pat Piper (politician) (1934–2016), American politician
Sue Piper (born 1951), retired New Zealand unionist and local politician
 William Piper (1774–1852) American politician
 William Adam Piper (1826-1899), American politician
 William G. Piper (1906–1976), American politician

In sports
 Carly Piper (born 1983), American former swimmer
 Cherie Piper (born 1981), Canadian retired ice hockey player
 David Piper (racing driver) (born 1930), British former racing driver
 Donald Piper (basketball) (1911–1963) American basketball player
 Jim Piper (born 1981), Australian swimmer
 Jim Piper (footballer) (1884–1949), Australian rules footballer
 Keith Piper (cricketer) (born 1969), former Warwickshire wicketkeeper
 Keith W. Piper (1921–1997), American football coach
 Matt Piper (born 1981), English footballer
 Nesta Piper (born 1982), Montserratian cricketer
 Nicky Piper (born 1966), Welsh retired boxer
 Norman Piper (born 1948), English former footballer
 Oliver Piper (1884–1933), Welsh-born Irish rugby union player
 Pat Pieper (1886–1974), American sports announcer

Other
 Arthur William Piper (1865–1936), judge of the Supreme Court of South Australia
 Carl Edward Vilhelm Piper (1820-1891), Swedish nobleman and diplomat
 Earl S. Piper (1905–1979), U.S. Marine Corps Brigadier general
 Hedda Piper (1746-1812), Swedish courtier
 John Piper (broadcaster), BBC radio host
 John Piper (military officer) (1773-1851), Scottish-born officer, lieutenant-governor of Norfolk Island
 Katie Piper (born 1983), English former model and TV presenter who suffered an acid attack to the face
 Leonora Piper (1857–1950), American trance medium
 Peter Piper (Royal Navy officer) (1913–1995), Second World War officer
 Reg Piper (born 1942), Australian former Anglican bishop
 Robert Piper, Australian United Nations official
 Sophie Piper (1757–1816), Swedish countess
 Stina Piper (1734–1800), Swedish countess

See also
 Heidemarie Stefanyshyn-Piper (born 1963), American astronaut
 Marty Willson-Piper (born 1958), English guitarist
 Peiper, another surname

References

English-language surnames